Lost Cause is the 21st album by Jandek, and his only of 1992. Corwood Industries release #0759, it marks the end of the "electric phase". It features a little of all the styles on the previous 20 albums, and ends with a sidelong abstract improvisation called "The Electric End."

Track listing

Reviews
Side one has seven non-datable tracks of depressed blues-destroying ramble... Early optimism on the opening tracks transmutes into full desolation by the closing hack-gulps at the end... “The Electric End” is a 19-plus minute excursion into frothful extremes. Piercing electro-search guitar, revolutionary ultra-primitive drumming, lost-mind vocalism of real cracked creation and some sort of high end squeal (a penny whistle?) combine in an incredibly wasted fashion.

-- Jimmy Johnson Forced Exposure #18

References

External links 
Seth Tisue's Lost Cause review

Jandek albums
1992 albums
Corwood Industries albums